Anatolii Prysiazhniuk (born 15 July 1953, Haisyn Raion) is a Ukrainian politician and chief of militsiya.

Born July 15, 1953 in. Kun Gaysinsky district of Vinnytsia region. In 1980 graduated from Kamyanets-Podilskyi Agricultural Institute, specializing in mechanization of agriculture, and qualified engineer-mechanics, 1993 — Ukrainian Academy of Internal Affairs in the specialty "Jurisprudence".

Biography 
1972 — Accountant of a mechanized detachment of the Gaisinsky district association “Agricultural machinery” of the Vinnytsia region.

Since 1972 to 1974 — service in the military benches of the USSR.

Since 1974 — engineer-technologist of the Gaisinsky district association “Agricultural machinery” of the Vinnytsia region.

From 1974 to 1975 — a listener of the Faculty of Kamyanets-Podilsky Agricultural Institute.

Since September 1975 to August 1980 — student of the Kamyanets-Podilsky Agricultural Institute.

Since 1980 to 1981 — assistant of the department of repair of machines and technologies of metal Kamyanets-Podilsky Agricultural Institute.

Since October 1982 to August 1983 — State Inspector of Internal Affairs of the Simferopol Paradise of the Crimean region, Simferopol.

Since 1983, in 1993, a way from the inspector of the Road-Patrol Department of the Ministry of Internal Affairs of the Ministry of Internal Affairs was held. Simferopol to the Deputy Head of the Ministry of Internal Affairs of the Crimea.

Since 1993 to 1994 — Deputy Minister of Internal Affairs of Crimea, Simferopol.

Since 1994 to 2001 — Deputy Head of the Main Directorate of the Ministry of Internal Affairs of Ukraine in Crimea, Simferopol.

Since 2001 to 2003 — Head of the Ministry of Internal Affairs of Ukraine in Poltava region.

Since 2003, in May 2005 — Deputy Minister of Internal Affairs of Ukraine — Head of Police Public Security, Kyiv.

After the service in the Ministry of Internal Affairs took office:

Deputy Chairman of the Council of Ministers of the Autonomous Republic of Crimea.

Since September 2006, in November 2009 — Chairman of the Board of Dac "Chornomornaftogaz".

From November 10, 2009 to March 2010 — Deputy Head of the Security Service of Ukraine.

From March 19, 2010 to March 2, 2014 — Head of the Kyiv Regional State Administration.

Rewards 
2000 — Order “For Merits” of the III degree.

2002 — Honorary title “Honored Lawyer of Ukraine”.

2003 — Honorary Diploma of the Cabinet of Ministers of Ukraine.

Thanks to the President of Ukraine.

2008 — honorary title “Honored Worker of Industry of the Autonomous Republic of Crimea”.

Thanks to the permanent representative of the President of Ukraine in the Autonomous Republic of Crimea.

2009 — Order “For Merit” II degree.

July 15, 2013 — Order “For Merit” and Art. — for a significant personal contribution to state construction, socio-economic development of the Kyiv region, many years of conscientious labor and high professionalism.

Political activity 
MP of the Verkhovna Rada of the Autonomous Republic of Crimea convocation of 1998-2002.

Since 2006 — a deputy of the Verkhovna Rada of the Autonomous Republic of Crimea of the Fifth convocation.

References

External links 
 Anatolii Prysyazhnyuk at the Official Ukraine Today portal

1953 births
Living people
People from Vinnytsia Oblast
Party of Regions politicians
Communist Party of Ukraine politicians
Governors of Kyiv Oblast
Chornomornaftogaz
Colonel Generals of Ukraine
Ukrainian police officers
Ukrainian chief executives
Ukrainian businesspeople in the oil industry